Leobaldo Pereira Pulido (born July 31, 1972) is a Cuban sprint canoeist who competed in the late 1990s and the early 2000s. He won the silver medal in the C-2 1000 m event at the 2000 Summer Olympics in Sydney.

Pereira also won four medals at the ICF Canoe Sprint World Championships with a gold (C-2 500 m: 2001), a silver (C-2 1000 m: 1999), and two bronzes (C-2 200 m and C-2 1000 m: both 2001).

References

1972 births
Canoeists at the 2000 Summer Olympics
Cuban male canoeists
Living people
Olympic canoeists of Cuba
Olympic silver medalists for Cuba
Olympic medalists in canoeing
ICF Canoe Sprint World Championships medalists in Canadian
Medalists at the 2000 Summer Olympics
20th-century Cuban people
21st-century Cuban people